Luís Pires (15th century/16th century) was a Portuguese explorer who accompanied Pedro Álvares Cabral in the discovery of Brazil, being one of the captains of the fleet. On leaving the Cape Verde Islands, Pires was forced by a storm to return to Lisbon, never having reached Brazil or India (the initial and official destination of the journey).

See also
Exploration of Asia

Portuguese explorers
Maritime history of Portugal
Year of birth missing
Year of death missing
15th-century births
15th-century explorers